"Shakermaker" is a song by the English rock band Oasis. It was written by lead guitarist Noel Gallagher. The song was first released as a second single on 20 June 1994 and later released on Oasis' debut album Definitely Maybe (1994). The single peaked at number eleven in the UK. It was certified silver by the British Phonographic Industry in 2013, having previously been their only single of the 1990s not to be certified in the UK. As of 2021, it remains the only single from the band's first two albums not to reach at least platinum status in the UK, and their only single of the 1990s not to be certified gold.

Background
Noel Gallagher states that the lyrics are taken from the world around him. For example, a Shaker Maker was a popular toy in the 1970s, the character of "Mr Soft" was taken from a Trebor Soft Mints commercial, which featured Cockney Rebel's song "Mr. Soft", "Mr. Clean" is a song by The Jam, one of Gallagher's favourite bands, Mr Benn is a British children's cartoon and the entire last verse – "Mr Sifter sold me songs / When I was just 16 / Now he stops at traffic lights / But only when they're green" – was written in a taxi on the way to the recording studio to record the song. Apparently, Liam Gallagher was pestering Noel to finish the song. At this point, the taxi stopped at the traffic lights outside "Sifters" (a record shop on Fog Lane, Didsbury, Manchester), named after people 'sifting' through records and run by Peter Howard since 1977. Noel penned the lyric and it became part of the song. Noel used to frequent the store to buy old records before Oasis started releasing albums.

The song illustrates Noel Gallagher's habit of borrowing from the past: the chords are a simple twelve-bar blues progression (albeit with the V (F) raised to a flat-VII (A)).  The melody for the verse was originally taken from "I'd Like to Teach the World to Sing (In Perfect Harmony)" by Roger Cook, Roger Greenaway, Bill Backer and Billy Davis.  An Oasis tribute band called No Way Sis released a cover version of "I'd Like to Teach the World to Sing" in the style of "Shakermaker", emphasising the similarity between the two songs. This cover reached No. 27 on the UK Singles Chart in December 1996. Oasis were sued over this similarity and were forced to change their composition.

B-sides
The song was released with three B-sides: "D'Yer Wanna Be a Spaceman?" (first appearing on the Live Recordings demo tape), sung by Noel Gallagher, which is instrumentally similar to "Married with Children" from Definitely Maybe and features nostalgic lyrics and two-part backing vocals by Liam; "Alive", a rough demo of an early rocker, and a live version of "Bring It on Down".

Music video
The music video was shot in Burton Road, Manchester nearby the Gallaghers' childhood home. The field they are playing football in is Didsbury Toc H Sports Ground in Fog Lane, Didsbury in South Manchester.

The album Liam shows to the camera is Paul McCartney's 1973 album Red Rose Speedway. The music video garnered 3.6 million views on YouTube.

Personnel
Liam Gallagher: lead vocals, tambourine
Noel Gallagher: lead guitars, backing vocals
Paul Arthurs: rhythm guitar
Paul McGuigan: bass
Tony McCarroll: drums

Track listings
CD CRESCD 182
"Shakermaker" – 5:08
"D'Yer Wanna Be a Spaceman?" – 2:41
"Alive" (8-track demo) – 3:56
"Bring It on Down" (live) – 4:17

7" CRE 182
"Shakermaker" – 5:08
"D'Yer Wanna Be a Spaceman?" – 2:41

12" CRE 182T
"Shakermaker" – 5:08
"D'Yer Wanna Be a Spaceman?" – 2:41
"Alive" (8-track demo) – 3:56

Cassette CRECS 182
"Shakermaker" – 5:08
"D'Yer Wanna Be a Spaceman?" – 2:41

CD Maxi-Single Shakermaker HES 661377 2
"Shakermaker" – 5:11
"D'Yer Wanna Be A Spaceman?" – 2:41
"Alive" (8 Track Demo)	 – 3:57
"Bring It On Down" (Live) – 4:18
"I Will Believe" (Live) – 3:48
"Cloudburst" – 5:19

Charts

Certifications

References

External links
Oasisinet – The Official Oasis Website

Oasis (band) songs
1994 singles
Creation Records singles
Neo-psychedelia songs
Songs written by Noel Gallagher
Song recordings produced by Noel Gallagher
Song recordings produced by Liam Gallagher
Songs involved in plagiarism controversies
1994 songs